The Campeonato Piauiense is the football league of the state of Piauí, Brazil. The competition is organized by the Piauí Football Federation.

Clubs

The following teams will compete in the Campeonato Piauiense in the 2022 season.

List of champions

Liga Sportiva Parnahybana

Liga Theresinense de Esportes Terrestres

Federação de Futebol do Piauí

Titles by team

Teams in bold stills active.

By city

References

External links
 FFP Official Website

 
Piauiense